Athol Fugard OIS HonFRSL (born 11 June 1932), is a South African playwright, novelist, actor, and director widely regarded as South Africa's greatest playwright. He is best known for his political and penetrating plays opposing the system of apartheid and for the 2005 Oscar-winning film of his novel Tsotsi, directed by Gavin Hood. 

Acclaimed as "the greatest active playwright in the English-speaking world" by Time in 1985, Fugard continues to write and has published more than thirty plays. Fugard was an adjunct professor of playwriting, acting and directing in the Department of Theatre and Dance at the University of California, San Diego. He is the recipient of many awards, honours, and honorary degrees, including the 2005 Order of Ikhamanga in Silver "for his excellent contribution and achievements in the theatre" from the government of South Africa. He is also an Honorary Fellow of the Royal Society of Literature. 

Fugard was honoured in Cape Town with the opening of the Fugard Theatre in District Six in 2010, and received a Tony Award for lifetime achievement in 2011.

Personal history
Fugard was born as Harold Athol Lanigan Fugard, in Middelburg, Eastern Cape, South Africa, on 11 June 1932. His mother, Marrie (Potgieter), an Afrikaner, operated first a general store and then a lodging house; his father, Harold Fugard, was a disabled former jazz pianist of Irish, English and French Huguenot descent. In 1935, his family moved to Port Elizabeth. In 1938, he began attending primary school at Marist Brothers College. After being awarded a scholarship, he enrolled at a local technical college for secondary education and then studied Philosophy and Social Anthropology at the University of Cape Town, but he dropped out of the university in 1953, a few months before final examinations. He left home, hitchhiked to North Africa with a friend, and then spent the next two years working in east Asia on a steamer ship, the SS Graigaur, where he began writing, an experience "celebrated" in his 1999 autobiographical play The Captain's Tiger: a memoir for the stage.

In September 1956, he married Sheila Meiring, a University of Cape Town Drama School student whom he had met the previous year. Now known as Sheila Fugard, she is a novelist and poet. Their daughter Lisa Fugard is a novelist. In 2015, after almost 60 years of marriage, the couple divorced. In 2016, in New York City Hall, Fugard was married to South African writer and academic Paula Fourie. Fugard and Fourie presently live in the Cape Winelands region of South Africa with their daughter, Halle Fugard Fourie.

The Fugards moved to Johannesburg in 1958, where he worked as a clerk in a Native Commissioners' Court, which "made him keenly aware of the injustices of apartheid." He was good friends with prominent local anti-apartheid figures, which had a profound impact on Fugard, whose plays' political impetus brought him into conflict with the national government; to avoid prosecution, he had his plays produced and published outside South Africa. A former alcoholic, Fugard has been a teetotaler since the early 1980s.

For several years, Fugard lived in San Diego, California, where he taught as an adjunct professor of playwriting, acting, and directing in the Department of Theatre and Dance at the University of California, San Diego (UCSD). For the academic year 2000–2001, he was the IU Class of 1963 Wells Scholar Professor at Indiana University in Bloomington, Indiana. In 2012, Fugard relocated to South Africa, where he now lives permanently.

Career

Early period
In 1958, Fugard organised "a multiracial theatre for which he wrote, directed, and acted", writing and producing several plays for it, including No-Good Friday (1958) and Nongogo (1959), in which he and his colleague black South African actor Zakes Mokae performed. In 1978, Richard Eder of The New York Times criticized Nongogo as "awkward and thin. It is unable to communicate very much about its characters, or make them much more than the servants of a noticeably ticking plot." Eder argued, "Queenie is the most real of the characters. Her sense of herself and where she wants to go makes her believable and the crumbling of her dour defenses at a touch of hope makes her affecting. By contrast, Johnny is unreal. His warmth and hopefulness at the start crumble too suddenly and too completely".

After returning to Port Elizabeth in the early 1960s, Athol and Sheila Fugard started The Circle Players, which derives its name from the production of The Caucasian Chalk Circle by Bertolt Brecht.

In 1961, in Johannesburg, Fugard and Mokae starred as the brothers Morris and Zachariah in the single-performance world première of Fugard's play The Blood Knot (revised and retitled Blood Knot in 1987), directed by Barney Simon. In 1989, Lloyd Richards of The Paris Review declared The Blood Knot to be Fugard's first "major play".

Refusal to stage for "Whites Only" audiences
In 1962, Fugard found the question of whether he could "work in a theatre which excludes 'Non-Whites'--or includes them only on the basis of special segregated performance-- increasingly pressing". It was made more so by the decision of British Equity to prevent any British entertainer visiting South Africa unless the audiences were multi-racial. In a decision that caused him to reflect on the power of art to effect change, Fugard decided that the "answer must be No".That old argument used to be so comforting; so plausible: 'One person in that segregated, white audience, might be moved to think, and then to change, by what he saw'. 
I'm beginning to wonder whether it really works that way. The supposition seems to be that there is a didactic--a teaching through feeling element in art. What I do know is that art can give meaning, can render meaningful areas of experience, and most certainly also enhances. But teach? Contradict? State the opposite to what you believe and then lead you to accept it?
In other words, can art change a man or woman? No. That is what life does. Art is no substitute for life.
Of the few venues in the country where a play can be presented to mixed audiences some, Fugard noted, were little better than barns. But he concluded that under these circumstances "every conceivable dignity--audience, producer, act, 'professional' etc.--" was "operative" in the white theatre except one, "human dignity".

Fugard publicly supported the Anti-Apartheid Movement (1959–94) in the international boycott of South African theatres due to their segregated audiences. The results were additional restrictions and surveillance, leading him to have his plays published and produced outside South Africa.

Lucille Lortel produced The Blood Knot at the Cricket Theatre, Off Broadway, in New York City in 1964, "launch[ing]" Fugard's "American career."

The Serpent Players
In the 1960s, Fugard formed the Serpent Players, whose name derives from its first venue, the former snake pit (hence the name) at the Port Elizabeth Museum, "a group of black actors worker-players who earned their living as teachers, clerks, and industrial workers, and cannot thus be considered amateurs in the manner of leisured whites", developing and performing plays "under surveillance by the Security Police", according to Loren Kruger's The Dis-illusion of Apartheid, published in 2004. The group largely consisted of black men, including Winston Ntshona, John Kani, Welcome Duru, Fats Bookholane and Mike Ngxolo as well as Nomhle Nkonyeni and Mabel Magada. They all got together, albeit at different intervals, and decided to do something about their lives using the stage. In 1961 they met Athol Fugard, a white man who grew up in Port Elizabeth and who recently returned from Johannesburg, and asked him if he could work with them "as he had the know-how theatrically—the tricks, how to use the stage, movements, everything"; they worked with Athol Fugard since then, "and that is how the Serpent Players got together." At the time, the group performed anything they could lay their hands on in South Africa as they had no access to any libraries. These included Bertolt Brecht, August Strindberg, Samuel Beckett, William Shakespeare and many other prominent playwrights of the time. In an interview in California, Ntshona and Kani were asked why they were doing the play Sizwe Banzi Is Dead, considered a highly political and telling story of the South African political landscape at the time. Ntshona answered: "We are just a group of artists who love theatre. And we have every right to open the doors to anyone who wants to take a look at our play and our work...We believe that art is life and conversely, life is art. And no sensible man can divorce one from the other. That's it. Other attributes are merely labels." They mainly performed at the St Stephen's Hall – renamed the Douglas Ngange Mbopa Memorial Hall in 2013 – adjacent to St Stephen's Church, and other spaces in and around New Brighton, the oldest Black township in Port Elizabeth.

According to Loren Kruger, Professor of English and Comparative Literature at the University of Chicago, 
the Serpent Players used Brecht's elucidation of gestic acting, dis-illusion, and social critique, as well as their own experience of the satiric comic routines of urban African vaudeville, to explore the theatrical force of Brecht's techniques, as well as the immediate political relevance of a play about land distribution. Their work on the Caucasian Chalk Circle and, a year later, on Antigone led directly to the creation, in 1966, of what is still [2004] South Africa's most distinctive Lehrstück [learning play]:The Coat. Based on an incident at one of the many political trials involving the Serpent Players, The Coat dramatized the choices facing a woman whose husband, convicted of anti-apartheid political activity, left her only a coat and instructions to use it.

Clive Barnes of The New York Times panned People Are Living There (1969) in 1971, arguing: "There are splinters of realities here, and pregnancies of feeling, hut [sic] nothing of significance emerges. In Mr. Fugard's earlier plays he seemed to be dealing with life at a proper level of humanity. Here—if real people are living there—they remain oddly quiet about it...The first act rambles disconsolately, like a lonely type writer looking for a subject and the second act produces with pride a birthday party of Chaplinesque bathos but less than Chaplinesque invention and spirit..[The characters] harangue one another in an awkward dislocation between a formal speech and an interior monologue." Mark Blankenship of Variety negatively reviewed a 2005 revival of the same work, writing that it "lacks the emotional intensity and theatrical imagination that mark such Fugard favorites" as "Master Harold"...and the Boys. Blankenship also stated, however, that the performance he attended featuring "only haphazard sketches of plot and character" was perhaps the result of Fugard allowing director Suzanne Shepard to revise the play without showing him the changes.

The Serpent Players conceptualised and co-authored many plays that it performed for a variety of audiences in many theatres around the world. The following are some of its notable and most popular plays:

 Its first production was Niccolò Machiavelli's La Mandragola, directed by Fugard as The Cure and set in the township. Other productions include Georg Buchner's Woyzeck, Brecht's The Caucasian Chalk Circle and Sophocles' Antigone. When the group had turned to improvisation, they came up with classic works such as Sizwe Banzi Is Dead and The Island, emerging as inner experiences of the actors who are also the co-authors of the plays.
 In The Coat, Kruger observes, "The participants were engaged not only in representing social relationships on stage but also on enacting and revising their own dealings with each other and with institutions of apartheid oppression from the law courts downward", and "this engagement testified to the real power of Brecht's apparently utopian plan to abolish the separation of player and audience and to make of each player a 'statesman' or social actor...Work on The Coat led indirectly to the Serpent Players' most famous and most Brechtian productions: Sizwe Banzi Is Dead (1972) and The Island (1973)."
Fugard developed these two plays for the Serpent Players in workshops, working with John Kani and Winston Ntshona, publishing them in 1974 with his own play Statements After an Arrest Under the Immorality Act (1972). The authorities considered the title of The Island, which alludes to Robben Island, the prison where Nelson Mandela was being held, too controversial, so Fugard and the Serpent Players used the alternative title The Hodoshe Span (Hodoshe meaning "carrion fly" in Xhosa).
 These plays "espoused a Brechtian attention to the demonstration of gest and social situations and encouraged audiences to analyze rather than merely applaud the action"; for example, Sizwe Banzi Is Dead, which infused a Brechtian critique and vaudevillian irony-–especially in Kani's virtuoso improvisation-–even provoked an African audience's critical interruption and interrogation of the action. 
 While dramatising frustrations in the lives of his audience members, the plays simultaneously drew them into the action and attempted to have them analyse the situations of the characters in Brechtian fashion, according to Kruger.
 Blood Knot was filmed by the BBC in 1967, with Fugard's collaboration, starring the Jamaican actor Charles Hyatt as Zachariah and Fugard himself as Morris, as in the original 1961 première in Johannesburg. Less pleased than Fugard, the South African government of B.J. Vorster confiscated Fugard's passport.

Fugard's play A Lesson from Aloes (1978) was described as one of his major works by Alvin Klein of The New York Times, though others have written more lukewarm reviews.

Yale Rep premieres, 1980s

"Master Harold"...and the Boys, written in 1982, incorporates "strong autobiographical matter"; nonetheless "it is fiction, not memoir", as Cousins: A Memoir and some of Fugard's other works are subtitled. The play deals with the relationship between a 17-year-old white South African and two African men who work for the white youth's family. Its world premiere was performed by Danny Glover, Zeljko Ivanek and Zakes Mokae, at the Yale Repertory Theater in New Haven, Connecticut, in March 1982. 

The Road to Mecca was presented at the Yale Repertory Theatre, New Haven, Connecticut, in May 1984. Directed by Fugard, the cast starred Carmen Mathews, Marianne Owen, and Tom Aldredge. Along with Master Harold, it proved to be one of Fugard's most acclaimed works.  It is the story of an elderly recluse in a small South African town who has spent 15 years on an obsessive artistic project. 

Fugard appeared in his A Place With the Pigs at the Yale Rep in New Haven CT, in 1987. Inspired by the true story of World War II Soviet deserter, Fugard plays a paranoid who spent four decades hiding with his pigs. As with The Road to Mecca, Fugards critics readily appreciated the metaphor for a life of internal exile.

Post-apartheid plays 
The first play that Fugard wrote after the end of apartheid, Valley Song, was premiered in Johannesburg, in August, 1995, with Fugard in the role of both a white, and of a coloured, farmer. While they dispute property titles, both share a reverence for the land and fear change. In October 1995, Fugard took the play to the United States with a production by the Manhattan Theatre Club at the McCarter Theatre in Princeton, New Jersey.

In January 2009, Fugard returned to New Haven for the premiere in the Coming Home. Veronika, the granddaughter of Buk, the coloured farmer in Valley Song, leaves the Karoo to pursue a singing career in Cape Town but then returns, after his death, to create a new life on the land for her young son.

The Fugard Theatre, in the District Six area of Cape Town opened with performances by the Isango Portobello theatre company in February 2010 and a new play written and directed by Athol Fugard, The Train Driver, played at the theatre in March 2010.

In April 2014, returned to the stage in the world premiere of his The Shadow of a Hummingbird at the Long Wharf Theatre, New Haven. This short play was performed with an “introductory scene” compiled by Paula Fourie from Fugard’s journal writings. With "the playwright digging through these diaries on a set which resembles an old, busy writer’s workspace", the scene blends into the main play, which begins when Boba, the grandson of the story-telling grandfather character Oupa (played by Fugard) comes to visit.

Film 
Fugard's plays are produced internationally, have won multiple awards, and several have been made into films (see Filmography below). Fugard himself performed in the first of these, as Boesman alongside Yvonne Bryceland as Lena, in Boesman and Lena directed by Ross Devenish in 1973.

His film debut as a director occurred in 1992, when he co-directed the adaptation of his play The Road to Mecca with Peter Goldsmid, who also wrote the screenplay. The film adaptation of his novel Tsotsi, written and directed by Gavin Hood, won the 2005 Academy Award for Best Foreign Language Film in 2006.

Outside of his own work, Fugard has a number of cameo film roles, most notably as General Smuts in Richard Attenborough's Gandhi (1982), and as Doctor Sundesval  in Sydney Schanberg's The Killing Fields (1984).

Plays
In chronological order of first production and/or publication:

Bibliography
 Statements: [Three Plays]. Oxford and New York: Oxford University Press (OUP), 1974.  (10).   (13).  (10).  (13). (Co-authored with John Kani and Winston Ntshona; see below.)
 Three Port Elizabeth Plays: Blood Knot; Hello and Goodbye; and Boesman and Lena. Oxford and New York, 1974. .
 Sizwe Bansi Is Dead and The Island. New York: Viking Press, 1976. 
 Dimetos and Two Early Plays. Oxford and New York: OUP, 1977. .
 Boesman and Lena and Other Plays. Oxford and New York: OUP, 1980. .
 Selected Plays of Fugard: Notes. Ed. Dennis Walder. London: Longman, 1980. Beirut: York Press, 1980. .
 Tsotsi: a novel. New York: Random House, 1980. .
 A Lesson from Aloes: A Play. Oxford and New York: OUP, 1981.
 Marigolds in August. A.D. Donker, 1982. .
 Boesman and Lena. Oxford and New York: OUP, 1983. .
 People Are Living There. Oxford and New York: OUP, 1983. .
 "Master Harold"...and the Boys. New York and London: Penguin, 1984. .
 Notebooks 1960-1977. New York: Alfred A. Knopf, 1984. 
 The Road to Mecca: A Play in Two Acts. London: Faber and Faber, 1985. . [Suggested by the life and work of Helen Martins of New Bethesda, Eastern Cape, South Africa.]
 Selected Plays. Oxford and New York: OUP, 1987. . [Includes: "Master Harold"...and the Boys; Blood Knot (new version); Hello and Goodbye; Boesman and Lena.]
 A Place with the Pigs: a personal parable. London: Faber and Faber, 1988. .
 My Children! My Africa! and Selected Shorter Plays. Ed. and introd. Stephen Gray.  Johannesburg: Witwatersrand UP, 1990. .
 Blood Knot and Other Plays. New York: Theatre Communications Group, 1991. .
 Playland and Other Worlds. Johannesburg: University of the Witwatersrand UP, 1992. .
 The Township Plays. Ed. and introd. Dennis Walder. Oxford and New York: Oxford UP, 1993.  (10).  (13). [Includes: No-good Friday, Nongogo, The Coat, Sizwe Bansi Is Dead, and The Island.]
 Cousins: A Memoir, Johannesburg: Witwatersrand UP, 1994. .
 Hello and Goodbye. Oxford and New York: OUP, 1994. .
 Valley Song. London: Faber and Faber, 1996. .
 The Captain's Tiger: A Memoir for the Stage. Johannesburg: Witwatersrand University Press, 1997. .
 Athol Fugard: Plays. London: Faber and Faber, 1998. .
 Interior Plays. Oxford and New York: OUP, 2000. .
 Port Elizabeth Plays. Oxford and New York: OUP, 2000. .
 Sorrows and Rejoicings. New York: Theatre Communications Group, 2002. .
 Exits and Entrances.  New York: Dramatists Play Service, 2004. .

Co-authored with John Kani and Winston Ntshona
 Statements: [Three Plays]. 1974. By Athol Fugard, John Kani, and Winston Ntshona. Rev. ed. Oxford and New York: OUP, 1978.  (10).  (13). ["Two workshop productions devised by Athol Fugard, John Kani, and Winston Ntshona, and a new play"; includes: Sizwe Bansi Is Dead and The Island, and Statements After an Arrest Under the Immorality Act.]

Co-authored with Ross Devenish
 The Guest: an episode in the life of Eugene Marais. By Athol Fugard and Ross Devenish. Craighall: A. D. Donker, 1977.  . (Die besoeker: 'n episode in die lewe van Eugene Marais. Trans. into Afrikaans by Wilma Stockenstrom. Craighall: A. D. Donker, 1977. .)

Filmography
Films adapted from Fugard's plays and novel
 Boesman and Lena (1974), dir. Ross Devenish
 Marigolds in August (1980), dir. Ross Devenish
 "Master Harold"...and the Boys (1984), TV movie, dir. Michael Lindsay-Hogg, first broadcast on Showtime
 The Road to Mecca (1991), co-dir. by Fugard and Peter Goldsmid (screen adapt.)
 Boesman and Lena (2000), dir. John Berry
 Tsotsi (2005), screen adapt. and dir. Gavin Hood; 2005 Academy Award for Best Foreign Language Film
 "Master Harold"...and the Boys (2010), dir. Lonny Price
Film roles
Boesman and Lena (1974) as Boesman
 The Guest at Steenkampskraal (1977) as Eugene Marais
Meetings with Remarkable Men (1979) as Professor Skridlov
Marigolds in August (1980) as Paulus Olifant 
Gandhi (1982) as General Jan Smuts 
The Killing Fields (1984) as Doctor Sundesval
The Road to Mecca (1991) as Reverend Marius Byleveld

Selected awards and nominations
 Praemium Imperiale 2014
Theatre
 Obie Award
 1971 – Best Foreign Play – Boesman and Lena (winner)
 Tony Award
 1975 – Best Play – Sizwe Banzi Is Dead / The Island – Athol Fugard, John Kani and Winston Ntshona (nomination)
 2011 – Special Tony Award Lifetime Achievement in the Theatre (winner)
 New York Drama Critics' Circle Awards
 1981 – Best Play – A Lesson From Aloes (winner)
 1988 – Best Foreign Play – The Road to Mecca (winner)
 Evening Standard Award
 1983 – Best Play – "Master Harold"...and the Boys (winner)
 Drama Desk Awards
 1982 – "Master Harold"...and the Boys (winner)
 Lucille Lortel Awards
 1992 – Outstanding Revival – Boesman and Lena (winner)
 1996 – Outstanding Body of Work (winner)
 The Audie Awards (Audio Publishers Association)
 1999 – Theatrical Productions – The Road to Mecca (winner)
 Outer Critics Circle Award
 2007 – Outstanding New Off-Broadway Play – Exits and Entrances (nomination)

Honorary awards
 Writers Guild of America, East Award
 1986 – Evelyn F. Burkey Memorial Award – (along with Lloyd Richards)
 National Orders Award (South Africa)
 2005 – The Order of Ikhamanga in Silver – "for his excellent contribution and achievements in the theatre"
 American Academy of Achievement's Golden Plate Award
 2014 - Golden Plate Award

Honorary degrees

 Yale University, 1983
 Wittenberg University, 1992
 University of the Witwatersrand, 1993
 Brown University, 1995
 Princeton University, 1998
 University of Stellenbosch, 2006

Reviews
 Fullerton, Ian (1980), review of Tsotsi, in Cencrastus No. 4. Winter 1980–81, p. 41,

See also

 South Africa under apartheid

Notes

References
 The Amajuba Resource Pack . The Oxford Playhouse and Farber Foundry: In Association with Mmabana Arts Foundation. Oxford Playhouse, October 2004.  Retrieved 1 October 2008. Downloadable PDF. ["Photographs by Robert Day; Written by Rachel G. Briscoe; Edited by Rupert Rowbotham; Overseen by Yael Farber." 18 pages.]
 Athol Fugard. Special issue of Twentieth Century Literature 39.4 (Winter 1993). Index. Findarticles.com. <http://findarticles.com/p/articles/mi_m0403/is_n4_v39>. Retrieved 4 October 2008. [Includes: Athol Fugard, "Some Problems of a Playwright from South Africa" (Transcript. 11 pages).]
Blumberg, Marcia Shirley, and Dennis Walder, eds. South African Theatre As/and Intervention. Amsterdam and Atlanta, Georgia: Editions Rodopi B.V., 1999.   (10).  (13).
Fugard, Athol. A Lesson from Aloes. New York: Theatre Communications Group, 1989.  (10).   (13). Google Books. Retrieved 1 October 2008. (Limited preview available.)
–––, and Chris Boyd. "Athol Fugard on Tsotsi, Truth and Reconciliation, Camus, Pascal and 'courageous pessimism'...", The Morning After: Performing Arts in Australia (Blog).  WordPress. 29 January 2006. Retrieved 4 October 2008. ["An edited interview with South African playwright Athol Fugard (in San Diego) on the publication of his only novel Tsotsi in Australia, 29 January 2006."]
–––, and Serena Davies.  "My Week: Athol Fugard". The Telegraph, 8 April 2007.  Retrieved 29 September 2008. [The playwright describes his week to Serena Davies, prior to the opening of his play Victory at the Theatre Royal, Bath (telephone interview).]
 Gray, Stephen. Athol Fugard. Johannesburg and New York: McGraw-Hill, 1982.  (10).  (13).  (10).  (13).
–––, ed. and introd. File on Fugard. London: Methuen Drama, 1991.  (10).  (13).
–––. My Children! My Africa! and Selected Shorter Plays, by Athol Fugard. Johannesburg: Witwatersrand University Press, 1990. .
Kruger, Loren. Post-Imperial Brecht Politics and Performance, East and South. Cambridge Studies in Modern Theatre. Cambridge and New York: Cambridge University Press, 2004.  (10).   (13). (Google Books; limited preview available.)
McDonald, Marianne.  "A Gift for His Seventieth Birthday: Athol Fugard's Sorrows and Rejoicings".  Department of Theatre and Dance. University of California, San Diego. Rpt. from TheatreForum 21 (Summer/Fall 2002). Retrieved 2 October 2008.
McLuckie, Craig (Okanagan College). "Athol Fugard (1932–)".  The Literary Encyclopedia.  8 October 2003.  Retrieved 29 September 2008.
Morris, Stephen Leigh.  "Falling Sky: Athol Fugard's Victory".  LA Weekly, 31 January 2008. Retrieved 29 September 2008. (Theatre review of the American première at The Fountain Theatre, Los Angeles, California.)
Spencer, Charles.  "Victory: The Fight's Gone Out of Fugard". The Telegraph, 17 August 2007. Retrieved 30 September 2008. [Theatre review of Victory at the Theatre Royal, Bath.]
Walder, Dennis. Athol Fugard. Writers and Their Work. Tavistock: Northcote House in association with the British Council, 2003.  (10).  (13).
Wertheim, Albert. The Dramatic Art of Athol Fugard: From South Africa to the World. Bloomington: Indiana University Press, 2000.   (10).  (13).
–––, ed. and introd. Athol Fugard: A Casebook. [Casebooks on Modern Dramatists]. Gen. Ed., Kimball King. New York: Garland Publishing, 1997.  (10).  (13). (Out of print; unavailable.) [Hardcover ed. published by Garland Publishing; the series of Casebooks on Modern Dramatists is now published by Routledge, an imprint of Taylor & Francis, and does not include this title.]

External links
 "Athol Fugard". Faculty profile. Department of Theatre and Dance. University of California, San Diego. (Lists Athol Fugard: Statements: An Athol Fugard site by Iain Fisher as "Personal Website"; see below.)
 
 
 
 Athol Fugard at the Internet Off-Broadway Database (IOBDb)
 Athol Fugard at Times Topics in The New York Times. (Includes YouTube Video clip of Athol Fugard's Burke Lecture "A Catholic Antigone: An Episode in the Life of Hildegard of Bingen", the Eugene M. Burke C.S.P. Lectureship on Religion and Society, at the University of California, San Diego, introduced by Professor of Theatre and Classics Marianne McDonald, UCSD Department of Theatre and Dance, April 2003 [Show ID: 7118].  1:28:57 [duration].)
 Athol Fugard at WorldCat
 "Athol Fugard Biography" – "Athol Fugard", rpt. by bookrags.com (Ambassadors Group, Inc.) from the Encyclopedia of World Biography. ("2005–2006 Thomson Gale, a part of the Thomson Corporation. All rights reserved.")
 "Athol Fugard (1932– )" at Britannica Online Encyclopedia (subscription based; free trial available)
 "Athol Fugard (1932– )" – Complete Guide to Playwright and Plays at Doollee.com
 Athol Fugard: Statements: An Athol Fugard site by Iain Fisher. (Listed as "Personal Website" in UCSB faculty profile; see above.)
 "Books by Athol Fugard" at Google Books (several with limited previews available)
 "Full Profile: Mr Athol 'Lanigan' Fugard" in Who's Who of Southern Africa. Copyright 2007 24.com (Media24). (Includes hyperlinked "News Articles" from 2000 to 2008.)
 "Interviews: South Africa's Fugards: Writing About Wrongs". Morning Edition. National Public Radio. NPR RealAudio. 16 June 2006. (With hyperlinked "Related NPR stories" from 2001 to 2006.)
 
 "Athol Fugard" in the Encyclopaedia of South African Theatre and Performance
 Nancy T. Kearns collection of Athol Fugard materials, 1983–1996, held by the Billy Rose Theatre Division, New York Public Library for the Performing Arts

1932 births
Living people
People from Middelburg, Eastern Cape
Afrikaner people
South African people of Dutch descent
South African people of Irish descent
South African people of English descent
South African people of French descent
South African male film actors
South African dramatists and playwrights
South African male novelists
Special Tony Award recipients
Fellows of the Royal Society of Literature
Writers Guild of America Award winners
Recipients of the Order of Ikhamanga
White South African anti-apartheid activists
Male dramatists and playwrights
20th-century South African writers
21st-century South African writers
20th-century South African male actors
21st-century South African male actors